Iron iodide may refer to:

 Iron(II) iodide (ferrous iodide, iron diiodide), FeI2
 Iron(III) iodide (ferric iodide, iron triiodide), FeI3, unstable